Eduardo Alberto Duhalde (born 5 October 1941) is an Argentine Peronist politician who served as the interim President of Argentina from January 2002 to May 2003. He also served as Vice President and Governor of Buenos Aires in the 1990s.

Born in Lomas de Zamora, he was elected for the local legislature and appointed intendente (mayor) in 1973. He was deposed during the 1976 Argentine coup d'état, and elected again when democracy was restored in 1983. He was elected vice-president of Argentina in 1989, under President Carlos Menem. Duhalde resigned as vice president and was elected Governor of Buenos Aires Province in 1991, and re-elected in 1995. 

He ran for president in 1999, being defeated by Fernando de la Rúa. De la Rúa resigned during the December 2001 riots, and Congress appointed the governor of San Luis Province Adolfo Rodríguez Saá as president. When Rodríguez Saá also resigned, Congress appointed Duhalde. During Duhalde's term in office, a huge currency devaluation and an increase of the exchange rate led to a gradual recovery. He successfully supported the candidate Néstor Kirchner against Menem, who sought a new presidential term. Duhalde had political disputes with Kirchner in later years, and is largely retired from politics since his defeat in the 2011 presidential elections.

Duhalde has been accused of having connections to drug trafficking, but there is no evidence of this.

Early life

Eduardo Alberto Duhalde was born in Lomas de Zamora, in the Greater Buenos Aires region. He graduated as a lawyer in 1970. He was elected to the city legislature the next year, and presided over it. He joined the Justicialist Party (PJ), and soon became leader of its local branch. The legislature impeached the mayor Ricardo Ortiz, as well as Pedro Turner, who was appointed mayor afterwards. This was part of a political reorganization promoted by President Danielle Perón. Duhalde was appointed mayor in 1973 as a result. Many members of the Peronist Youth were killed in Lomas de Zamora during the Pasco massacre, which Duhalde blamed on the Argentine Anticommunist Alliance. He was ousted from office during the 1976 Argentine coup d'état. He worked as a real estate broker during the following years.

Democratic rule was restored in 1983, and Duhalde ran for mayor of Lomas de Zamora. Being a centrist, the PJ appointed him candidate as a compromise between the internal opposing factions. The elections ended in a technical tie with the candidate of the Radical Civic Union (UCR), Horacio Devoy; Duhalde won by just 700 votes. There was a tie in the elections for the local legislature as well, as both the PJ and UCR got eleven legislators. Duhalde reported that a colonel sought his support for a possible coup against the newly elected president Raúl Alfonsín. Duhalde refused and reported directly to Alfonsín himself. He was elected national deputy in 1987, and became vice president of the Argentine Chamber of Deputies. He established a commission to fight drug addiction during his term of office.

Vice presidency and governorship

The PJ held primary elections for the 1989 presidential elections between Carlos Menem, governor of La Rioja, and Antonio Cafiero, governor of the Buenos Aires Province. Menem won these elections, with Duhalde as candidate for the vice presidency under his ticket, and then won the general elections. Duhalde did not like the legislative work, and preferred to work with the actual administration of a district. Menem suggested that he run for governor of the populous Buenos Aires Province, which Duhalde accepted on the condition of a great budget aid to the province. This proposal was supported in Congress by Alfonsín, which led to a steady alliance between both politicians. Duhalde was elected governor, ending the political influence of Cafiero.

Duhalde intended to run for the presidency in 1995, after Menem's term in office. Menem promoted the 1994 amendment of the Argentine Constitution, which allowed him to run for a second presidential term. Unable to defeat Menem in the primary elections, Duhalde promoted an amendment of the provincial constitution, to allow reelection as well. The PJ could not secure the majority of the constituent chamber, and the three opposing parties (the UCR, the Broad Front and the MODIN) joined forces in a "triple alliance" to prevent the sanction of the re-election. Eventually, the MODIN changed sides and supported the re-election, on the condition that a provincial referendum approved it. The referendum allowed the re-election of Duhalde, who won the main elections as well. Menem was also re-elected in the 1995 general elections. Duhalde increased his criticism of Menem, stating that he should leave the neoliberal policies and head a government closer to the Peronist doctrines.

As the new constitution allowed re-election a single time, the PJ started an internal discussion over the leadership of the party after the presidency of Menem. Duhalde announced his intentions to run for president in 1999 shortly after the 1995 elections, leading to a fierce dispute with Menem. The president promoted an advertisement campaign "Menem '99", despite of the term limit, to avoid being considered a lame duck. He also encouraged the governor of Tucumán, Palito Ortega, to run for the presidency as well. The political image of Duhalde was tarnished by a number of scandals that took place, and issues revealed by investigative journalists. Some of the scandals were related to the national government, such as the scandal over Argentine arms sales to Ecuador and Croatia, and harmed the reputation of the entire PJ. Other scandals involved Duhalde more directly, such as the corruption cases in the Buenos Aires provincial police and the murder of the news photographer José Luis Cabezas. The PJ lost the 1997 midterm elections, and Menem renewed the "Menem '99" campaign. Eventually, the Supreme Court ruled that his attempt to run for another presidential term was unconstitutional. Ortega run for vice president under Duhalde's ticket, but Duhalde was defeated by the radical Fernando de la Rúa.

De la Rúa's government would face an economic crisis and the 2001 riots, resigning two years later. De la Rúa thought that Duhalde had organized a coup d'état against him Rodolfo Terragno, De la Rúa's Chief of the Cabinet of Ministers, thought instead that the crisis was the exclusive result of keeping the peso-dollar parity despite the costs generated by it. Duhalde and other Peronists interviewed by Ceferino Reato for the book Doce noches said that the party had no interest in removing De la Rúa from power, because he was so unpopular that the party would win the 2003 presidential elections without a problem.

Presidency

Appointment

De la Rúa headed the country during an economic crisis, and resigned during the December 2001 riots. As his vice president had already resigned months before, Congress was convened to appoint a new president. Eleven provinces with low populations and Peronist governors had formed a bloc, the "Federal Front", and received the required votes to appoint the governor of San Luis Province, Adolfo Rodríguez Saá. The first administrative actions of Rodríguez Saá caused renewed protests, and the PJ did not fully support him. He called for a meeting with governors in Chapadmalal, but only six governors out of twenty-three attended. He resigned a few days later, and accused Duhalde of plotting against him, along with the governor of Córdoba, José Manuel de la Sota.

The Congress was convened again to appoint a new president. The "Federal Front" was weakened by the failure of Rodríguez Saá, and the provinces with higher populations increased their influence. The likely candidates were Duhalde, De la Sota, and Carlos Ruckauf, the governor of the Buenos Aires province at the time. Menem, who still had legislators loyal to him, wanted to prevent Duhalde from becoming president, and proposed to appoint the governor of Misiones Ramón Puerta instead. Puerta had been the acting president while Congress deliberated the first time, but he refused to be appointed president or even to serve as acting president a second time (Eduardo Camaño became the acting president as a result). Puerta talked with Duhalde, and opined that without De la Rúa and Álvarez he was the politician with the highest legitimacy to be appointed president, as he had placed second in the 1999 elections and won the 2001 legislative elections in the Buenos Aires province, the district of Argentina with the largest population. Alfonsín gave Duhalde decisive support, instructing the radical legislators to vote for him, and giving him two ministers, the radicals Horacio Jaunarena and Jorge Vanossi. The legislators loyal to Menem eventually voted for Duhalde as well. The radicals' support allowed Duhalde to govern for the remainder of De la Rúa's term of office, instead of governing for 90 days and calling for new elections, as was the case of Rodríguez Saá. Duhalde was appointed president on 2 January 2002.

Economic policy

Duhalde, Alfonsín, their parties, the unions and the Church all agreed to promote policies to increase the industrial growth of the country. For this purpose, Duhalde created the ministry of production, with functions that used to belong to the ministries of economy and foreign relations. The new minister was José Ignacio de Mendiguren, head of the Argentine Industrial Union. Alfonsín negotiated with him, on Duhalde's behalf, while Congress was still voting for the new president. Duhalde announced at his inauguration that he would repeal the convertibility plan, considered the main cause of the economic crisis. Although Menem proposed a full dollarization of the Argentine economy, Duhalde preferred to instead stick to the peso and order a devaluation. Although it was initially expected to make a 40% devaluation, the exchange rate of 1 peso to 1 dollar jumped to 3 pesos to 1 dollar, a 200% devaluation. The higher dollar price allowed for more lucrative exports, increased economic activity and a growth in the employment rates, but at the cost of a higher cost of living.

The financial operations made in dollars were subject to a strong currency substitution to pesos, the "pesification". There were disputes over the exchange rate of such substitution, as the current price of the dollar in the open market would force most firms and individual debtor to bankruptcy. The initial policy was to make 1 to 1 substitutions to the operations below 100,000 dollars. Another conflict was the corralito, imposed by De la Rúa, which attempted to stop the bank run by forbidding the withdrawal of money from bank accounts. Duhalde promised in his oath of office speech that "Those who deposited dollars [would] receive dollars". The minister of economy Jorge Remes Lenicov pointed out that that would be impossible, as the amount of dollars required was higher than even the foreign-exchange reserves of the Central Bank. Duhalde acknowledged two weeks later that he was mistaken. The bank accounts in dollars would be "pesified" at a 1.4 exchange rate, and the state financed the banks for the different rates with other operations. The taxes of public services were "pesified" and fixed at their current values. Most industries benefited from the "pesification" and the devaluation, as they could now export at higher prices, and the economy started to improve. The jump in the international price of soybean in July 2002 also proved highly beneficial. The devaluation also increased the price of imported products, which allowed import substitution industrialization. As the local prices became cheap in dollars, international tourism to the country was increased. The national state absorbed the debts of the provinces and the bonds used as alternative currency, on the condition that they transferred the power to issue bonds.

Jorge Remes Lenicov resigned in April, alongside ministers De Mendiguren and Capitanich. Peronist governors, legislators, and union leaders met at the Quinta de Olivos, amid rumors that Duhalde would appoint the populist Daniel Carbonetto as minister of economy. They gave their full support to the president and the economic policies instrumented so far. As a result, Duhalde appointed the conservative Roberto Lavagna. Lavagna was the Argentine ambassador to the European Union, and switched offices with Remes Lenicov. He was suggested by Governor Carlos Ruckauf and supported by Alfonsín. He stabilised prices and the exchange rate with tight fiscal and monetary policies, and prevented the crisis from growing into a hyperinflation. The recovery also benefited from the idle capacity of the economy.

Domestic policy
On the political level, Duhalde's presidency was strongly influenced by his feud with Menem. Menem wanted to run for a new term as president in the 2003 election, and Duhalde wanted to prevent it. To this purpose, he sought other candidates that may have defeated him. Some of these potential candidates were Carlos Reutemann, José Manuel de la Sota, Mauricio Macri, Adolfo Rodríguez Saá, Felipe Solá and Roberto Lavagna, but none of those negotiations bore fruit. The scandal over the death of the piqueteros Maximiliano Kosteki and Darío Santillán in the Avellaneda massacre forced Duhalde to rush the elections by six months. As a result, he chose Néstor Kirchner, governor of Santa Cruz Province, despite his reservations. Kirchner was fifth in the presidential polls, and was mostly unknown by the public. Duhalde speculated that, although Menem had a large number of willing voters to begin with, he was also very unpopular. Thus, Menem might have won the elections but if the results called for a ballotage, most of the population would rally under any candidate with a chance to defeat him.

To harm Menem's chances even further, the 2003 election used a variant of the Ley de Lemas for a single time. This way, the Peronists Menem, Kirchner and Rodríguez Saá did not run for primary elections, but faced each other directly in the open election. None of the three candidates ran on the Justicialist Party ticket, but for special parties created for the occasion: Menem for the "Front for Loyalty", Kirchner for the "Front for Victory" and Rodríguez Saá (who run for president anyway, but as a critic of Duhalde) for the "Front of the National and Popular Movement". It was also announced that Lavagna would stay as minister of Economy during a presidency of Kirchner, to capitalize the support for the ongoing economic policies. Menem defeated Kirchner in the elections, benefited by the lack of popular candidates, but gave up running for a ballotage, fearing that he would lose this special election.

Foreign policy

Duhalde was appointed president in the aftermath of the September 11 attacks, when the foreign policy of the United States was strictly focused on the War on Terror. Initially, the Argentine society was divided on how to manage the bilateral relations with the US. One group wanted to keep the close relations of the previous decade, as Argentina might need foreign help to deal with the crisis. The other group preferred to maintain more distant relations. Duhalde sought to strike a balance between both options, and eventually leaned towards the second when the US refused to help Argentina.

Argentina voted in the United Nations condemning the human rights violations in Cuba, but refused to send military forces to Afghanistan and Iraq. Still, Duhalde proposed to send peacekeeping troops, and strongly criticized the regime of Saddam Hussein and international terrorism. Duhalde increased his criticism of the United States during the final years of his government, and changed the vote in relation to Cuba to an abstention. Those changes were motivated by the upcoming 2003 elections. Menem, who was running for a third term as president, supported the vote condemning Cuba and the military aid to the United States.

The devaluation caused a diplomatic conflict with Spain, as Duhalde did not allow the Spanish service providers to raise taxes. So far, they received their income according to the dollar exchange rate, and intended to raise taxes to compensate their losses. The Argentine government considered that the effects of the crisis were already grave enough for the people, and further price increases would only worsen the situation. José María Aznar, prime minister of Spain, talked with Duhalde on behalf of the Spanish firms. The taxes were not raised, but Aznar stayed on good terms with Duhalde, and ratified the good relations with the country regardless of the victor of the 2003 elections.

Later years

Duhalde was succeeded by Néstor Kirchner on 25 May 2003. Kirchner soon distanced himself from Duhalde, and removed all the people close to Duhalde from the government to reduce his political influence. Kirchner also sought supporters from all the social and political spectra to counter the influence of Duhalde within the party. However, both men delayed an open dispute and stuck together during the 2003 legislative elections, held in October. The dispute continued in the 2005 midterm elections. Without consensus in the PJ for a single candidate for senator of the Buenos Aires province, both leaders had their respective wives run for the office: Hilda González de Duhalde for the PJ, and Cristina Fernández de Kirchner for the Front for Victory, which was kept by the Kirchners. Cristina Kirchner won those elections.

On 23 December 2009, Duhalde announced his intention to run for the presidency in the 2011 presidential elections. Néstor Kirchner had been succeeded by Cristina Kirchner in the presidency, staying as a highly influential figure, and it was still unclear which of the Kirchners would run in 2011. Many mayors of the Buenos Aires province were unsure whether to support Duhalde or the Kirchners. Duhalde organized the Federal Peronism faction, with members of the PJ opposing the Kirchners. Néstor Kirchner died in October 2010; the subsequent state funeral halted the campaign for a few months.

The Federal Peronism organized primary elections for the 2011 presidential elections between Duhalde and governor Alberto Rodríguez Saá, which would be held before the mandatory primary elections. Governors Felipe Solá and Mario Das Neves withdrew their candidacies. Duhalde withdrew his candidacy near the end of the primary elections. As the sole candidate, Rodríguez Saá ran for Federal Peronism, which allied with other provincial parties into the Federal Commitment coalition. Duhalde ran for president as well, on the Unión Popular ticket. He received nearly 6% of the vote in the main elections, a large difference from the number of votes cast for the main candidates, and Hilda Duhalde was not reelected as senator. In 2017 he announced that he intends to run for president of the PJ.

Personal life
Duhalde worked as a pool lifeguard before embarking on his political career. He met Hilda González at the pool in 1970 and they married the following year. They have five sons and seven grandsons. They live in a country house in San Vicente, Buenos Aires, named "Don Tomás" after Duhalde's father. The house had been donated for the creation of a foster care center which was never built, and was reclaimed by Duhalde. The rebuilt site includes a large grove, a pool, a tennis field, and an artificial lake.

Duhalde has largely retired from politics since his defeat in the 2011 elections. He sought to make amends with Menem for their past political rivalry, and met him during the 2013 Papal inauguration of Pope Francis. They had a private meeting at Menem's house, and Menem reported that they were on peaceful terms. They had previously met in similar circumstances in 2005, during the funeral of Pope John Paul II.

References

Bibliography

External links

 Official Website. Presented in Spanish
 Extended bio by CIDOB

Presidents of Argentina
1941 births
Living people
Vice presidents of Argentina
Governors of Buenos Aires Province
Members of the Argentine Senate for Buenos Aires Province
Members of the Argentine Chamber of Deputies elected in Buenos Aires Province
Justicialist Party politicians
Argentine people of Basque descent
People from Lomas de Zamora
Mayors of Lomas de Zamora
Argentine Roman Catholics
University of Buenos Aires alumni
20th-century Argentine politicians
21st-century Argentine politicians